The following is a list of the best records in the sport of athletics – including track and field, road running and racewalking – set by athletes representing one of the member states of the Organisation of Eastern Caribbean States.

Outdoor

Key to tables:
  

y = denotes 880 yards

# = not ratified by federation or/and IAAF

A = affected by altitude

Men

Women

Indoor

Men

Women

Notes

References

OECS
Organisation of Eastern Caribbean States